The 1873 Tyrone by-election was fought on 7 April 1873.  The byelection was fought due to the death of the incumbent MP of the Conservative Party, Henry Thomas Lowry-Corry. It was won by the Conservative candidate Henry William Lowry-Corry.

References

1873 elections in the United Kingdom
By-elections to the Parliament of the United Kingdom in County Tyrone constituencies
19th century in County Tyrone
1873 elections in Ireland